In statistics, the Bingham distribution, named after Christopher Bingham, is an antipodally symmetric probability distribution on the n-sphere. It is a generalization of the Watson distribution and a special case of the Kent and Fisher-Bingham distributions.

The Bingham distribution is widely used in paleomagnetic data analysis, and has been reported as being of use in the field of computer vision.

Its probability density function is given by

 
which may also be written
 

where x is an axis (i.e., a unit vector), M is an orthogonal orientation matrix, Z is a diagonal concentration matrix, and
 is a confluent hypergeometric function of matrix argument. The matrices M and Z are the result of diagonalizing the positive-definite covariance matrix of the Gaussian distribution that underlies the Bingham distribution.

See also
 Directional statistics
 von Mises–Fisher distribution
 Kent distribution

References

Directional statistics
Continuous distributions